Nikki Turner is an American author of urban fiction, dubbed by Trendsetter Magazine as the "Queen of Hip Hop Lit". Her first two books, A Hustler's Wife and A Project Chick have sold about 150,000 copies as of 2005.

Turner was born in Richmond, Virginia and has received a degree from North Carolina Central University. She formerly worked as a travel agent, eventually quitting to become a full-time novelist. Turner has stated that she began writing urban fiction as a way of showing the "dark side" of the street life beyond the "glitz and the glamor".

Bibliography
A Project Chick (2003)
The Glamorous Life: A Novel (2005) 
Riding Dirty on I-95: A Novel (2006) 
Death Before Dishonor (2007)
Black Widow: A Novel (2008)
Street Chronicles Girls in the Game (2008)
Christmas in the Hood (2008) 
Ghetto Superstar: A Novel (2009) 
Relapse: A Novel (2010) 
Natural Born Hustler (2010) 
A Woman's Work (2011) 
A Project Chick II (2013)
The Glamorous Life 2 (2013)
The Banks Sisters (2015)
Carl Weber's Kingpins: MIam (2015)

Girls from Da Hood
Girls from Da Hood (2006)
Tales from da Hood (2006)
Girls From Da Hood 2 (2008)
Girls from da Hood 4 (2010)

Hustler's Wife series
A Hustler's Wife (2002)
Forever a Hustler's Wife: A Novel (2008) 
Heartbreak of a Hustler's Wife: A Novel (2011)

Unique
Note: This series was released as an e-serial from 2012 to 2014
Unique (2014)
Unique II: Betrayal (2012)
Unique III: Revenge (2012)
Unique IV: Love & Lies (2013)
Unique V: Secrets Revealed (2014)
Always Unique (2014, collects stories I - V)

References

External links
 [archived]

Living people
21st-century American novelists
African-American novelists
American women novelists
Urban fiction
Year of birth missing (living people)
Writers from Richmond, Virginia
North Carolina Central University alumni
21st-century American women writers
Novelists from Virginia
Travel agents (people)
21st-century African-American women writers
21st-century African-American writers